The Mount Vision Fire was a wildfire that burned  of land on the Point Reyes National Seashore peninsula in northern California during October 1995.  The fire, which was started by an incompletely extinguished campfire, destroyed 45 homes in Inverness Park.

References

Wildfires in Marin County, California
1995 fires in the United States
1995 in California
1990s wildfires in the United States
Point Reyes National Seashore
West Marin
1995 natural disasters in the United States
October 1995 events in the United States